Amaury de Riencourt (born 12 June 1918 in Orléans, France; died 13 January 2005 at Bellevue, Switzerland) was a writer and historian. He was an expert on Southeast Asia, an Indian scholar, Sinologist, Tibetologist and Americanist.

Amaury de Riencourt was born in Orléans into a family of the French nobility which dates back at least to the 12th century. He graduated from the Sorbonne in Paris and held a Master's degree from the University of Algiers.

De Riencourt served in the French Navy during the earlier part of the Second World War (1939–40).

In 1947, he visited Tibet, staying in Lhasa, where he remained for five months. He met the Dalai Lama, who declared that the country was governed in all areas as an independent nation, adding that the orders of his government were obeyed across the country.

De Riencourt's magnum opus was probably The Coming Caesars [1957], which explores the ethnic and ideological roots of America, Europe and Russia, comparing also classical times with the contemporary world (19th-20th centuries). He also wrote a number of other books (all written in English), including The American Empire; Lost World: Tibet; The Eye of Shiva; The Soul of China; The Soul of India; Woman and Power in History; Sex and Power in History; Roof of the World: Tibet, and an autobiography entitled A Child of the Century.

References

1918 births
2005 deaths
French sinologists
Writers from Orléans
Tibetologists
University of Paris alumni
University of Algiers alumni
French people of colonial Algeria